Andreas Wilhelm Schwarzlose (31 July 1867 – 1936) was a German (originally Prussian) firearm designer who is best known for designing a blowback-operated machine gun.

Early life
Schwarzlose was born near Wust, and served as an artilleryman and armorer in the Austro-Hungarian army. He graduated from the National Ordnance College and designed his first pistol in 1892, although it never saw production. In the 1890s, he lived and worked in Suhl and designed the machine gun, he later got famous for. The MG was produced - mainly for the Austrian air forces - by the Österreichische Waffenfabriks-Gesellschaft. In 1897, he opened an arms factory in Berlin which he operated until 1919 when it was shut down by the Allied Disarmament Commission.

After the closing of his factory he worked as a firearms consultant until his death in 1936.

Designs
Schwarzlose MG M.07/12 machine gun (for Austria-Hungary)
Schwarzlose Model 1898 semi-automatic pistol
Schwarzlose Model 1908 semi-automatic pistol

References

Firearm designers
1936 deaths
1867 births
People from Charlottenburg